Ninemile Creek is a stream in the U.S. state of Georgia. It is a tributary to Broxton Creek.

Ninemile Creek received its name in the 1810s. The name sometimes is spelled out as "Nine Mile Creek".

References

Rivers of Georgia (U.S. state)
Rivers of Coffee County, Georgia